Fanni may refer to:

People 
 Fanni Gasparics (born 1994), Hungarian ice hockey player
 Fanni Gyarmati (1912–2014), wife of Hungarian teacher and poet Miklós Radnóti
 Fanni Gyurinovics (born 2001), Hungarian swimmer
 Fanni Kenyeres (born 1978), Hungarian handball player
 Fanni Luukkonen (1882–1947), Finnish leader of the Lotta Svärd
 Cosey Fanni Tutti (born 1951), English performance artist
 Rod Fanni (born 1981), French soccer player
 Salvatore Fanni (born 1964), Italian boxer
 Fanni Vivien Fabian, Hungarian swimmer and bronze medalist at the 2017 European Youth Summer Olympic Festival
 Fanni Illes, Hungarian swimmer in the 2008 Summer Paralympics
 Fanni Juhász, Hungarian pole vaulter and bronze medalist at the 2000 World Junior Championships in Athletics
 Fanni Matula, Hungarian swimmer and silver medalist at the 2017 European Youth Summer Olympic Festival
 Fanni Metelius (born 1987), Swedish actress in the 2014 international film Force Majeure
 Csutorás Fanni and Hutlassa Fanni, members of the Hungarian basketball team PEAC-Pécs
 Fanni Nizalowski, harpist for the Hungarian band Passed

Other 
 Fanni (chimpanzee) (born 1981), member of the Kasakela chimpanzee community in Gombe National Park, Tanzania
 Fanni Tellis Creek, a stream in the U.S. state of Ohio
 Fanni hagyományai, a Hungarian novel by József Kármán

See also 
 Fani (disambiguation)
 Fanny (disambiguation)
 Fannie (disambiguation)
 Fannie, a feminine given name